Mapping cone may refer to one of the following two different but related concepts in mathematics:
 Mapping cone (topology)
 Mapping cone (homological algebra)